YMCA Brown Matriculation Higher Secondary School is a Christian minority school. The school is unaided and co-educational and follows the Uniform Syllabus for School Education of the Government of Tamil Nadu. The school is established and administered by the Committee of Management of YMCA Boys' Division, Tirupattur – a project of the National Council of YMCAs of India.

History
The YMCA Boys' Division was started with two boys in 1937 to serve the student community in around Tirupattur. It was started in a rented building with a hostel for the rural student to stay and a club to develop physical, cultural, religious and educational activities. 
In the year 1963 an orphanage was started to cater to the needs of semi-orphaned and destitute boys. Until 1987, there was no nursery school or a primary school available in Tirupattur with affordable fee structure for the middle and the lower income groups of the local population. Therefore, it was decided to start a school in memory of Frank C Brown, the founder of YMCA Boys' Division.

Status
The School enjoys the recognition of the Government of Tamil Nadu and is also affiliated to the Board of Matriculation Schools of the Government of Tamil Nadu. The School was upgraded into a higher secondary school from the academic year 1994–1995. The school is co-educational and the medium of instruction is English.

References

External links
 http://ymcaschool.org.in/index.html

Christian schools in Tamil Nadu
Primary schools in Tamil Nadu
High schools and secondary schools in Tamil Nadu
Brown
Schools in Vellore district
Educational institutions established in 1987
1987 establishments in Tamil Nadu